Phosphatidylinositide phosphatase SAC1 is an enzyme that in humans is encoded by the SACM1L gene.

References

Further reading